Premier Financial Corp. is an American company that owns and operates Premier Bank and First Insurance Group. Headquartered in Defiance, Ohio, the company operates full service branches and automated teller machines in Ohio, Indiana and Michigan. While the company's history dates back to 1920, it was re-branded in 2020 following the merger of the parent companies that owned First Federal Bank of the Midwest (First Defiance Financial Corp) and Home Savings Bank (United Community Financial Corp.).

History
The bank was established in 1920 as FIRST FEDERAL SAVINGS AND LOAN ASSOCIATION OF DEFIANCE.

In 2000, the name of the bank was changed to First Federal Bank of the Midwest.

In March 2008, the company acquired Pavilion Bancorp Inc. and its subsidiary, the Bank of Lenawee.

In 2012, the company repurchased the stock issued to the United States Department of the Treasury in connection with its investment in the company via the Troubled Asset Relief Program and in 2015 the company repurchased the warrants issued to the Treasury.

In February 2014, the company announced a merger with First Community Bank and entered the Columbus, Ohio market. However, in April 2014, the merger agreement was terminated.

In February 2017, the company acquired Commercial Bancshares, Inc. and The Commercial Savings Bank for $70.3 million.

In January 2020, the holding company for First Federal Bank of the Midwest and First Insurance Group merged with United Community Financial Corp. In April 2020, the new company announced the unification of their banking businesses under the new name of Premier Bank.

References

External links

Banks established in 1920
Banks based in Ohio
Companies listed on the Nasdaq
1920 establishments in Ohio